Santa Maria di Capo di Bove (literally St Mary's at the Ox's Head) was a Romanesque church in Mantua, located near the porta di San Giorgio at the outer limits of the old city.  Francesco I Gonzaga had it demolished in 1395 by permission of pope Boniface IX to build his Castello di San Giorgio.

References

Buildings and structures in Mantua
Former churches in Italy